Timema ritense, the Santa Rita timema, is a species of walkingstick in the family Timematidae. It is found in North America. The species was originally spelled "ritensis", but this spelling did not match the gender of the genus Timema, and therefore has undergone a mandatory change following ICZN Article 31.2.

References

Further reading

 
 
 

Phasmatodea
Articles created by Qbugbot
Insects described in 1937